Pilot Baba is a revered Indian spiritual guru who had been Wing Commander Kapil Singh, a pilot in the Indian Air Force.

Early life and career 
Kapil Singh claims to have been commissioned in the Indian Air Force as a fighter pilot in 1957. He also claims to have participated in the Sino-Indian War of 1962, the Indo-Pakistani War of 1965 and the Indo-Pakistani War of 1971 wars, rising to the rank of Wing Commander.

Leaving the IAF and transformation 
During the Sino-Indian War of 1962 Kapil Singh was flying a MiG aircraft in the North-East of India also known as NEFA when his aircraft lost control. Radio contact with his base was also broken and he was believed lost.

THERE WERE NO MIG AIRCRAFT WITH IAF prior to 1964..HE IS A IAF fighter planes did not play any role in Sino Indian war..
https://en.wikipedia.org/wiki/List_of_historical_aircraft_of_the_Indian_Air_Force

According to Pilot Baba, Kapil's spiritual guru, Hari Baba, appeared in his cockpit and guided him to land his fighter aircraft safely.

This event became a turning point in young Kapil's life and ten years later, at the age of 33, he retired from the Air Force to pursue his spiritual life.

spiritual career
Pilot Baba is known for his claim to enter lengthy samadhi, or death-like bodily states, often under the ground.

Ashrams
Pilot Baba and his followers have set up ashrams (spiritual retreats or meditation centres) in both India and other countries.

Ashrams in India include:
Sasaram
Haridwar
Nainital
Uttarkashi

Ashrams in other countries include:
Japan
Nepal

Publications
Books written by Pilot Baba include:
 Kailash Mansarovar
 Pearls of Wisdom
 Discover Secrets of The Himalaya
 Antaryatra' The Inner Journey (2 volumes)
 Pilgrimage from You to Yourself
 Himalayan kah raha hai (2 volumes)

References

External links
Official website

Indian Air Force officers
1938 births
People from Sasaram
Banaras Hindu University alumni
Indian Hindu spiritual teachers
Indian spiritual writers
Living people